Bairagi (raga), also known as Bairagi bhairav, is a Hindustani classical raga.

Thaat: Bhairav

Jati: Audav

Aaroh:  

Avroh: 

Pakad: 

Vadi: ma

Samvadi: Sa

Time: Early morning

Film Songs

Language:Tamil 
Note that the following songs are composed in Revati, the equivalent of raga Bairagi Bhairav in Carnatic music.

References

External links 
 SRA on Samay and Ragas
 More details about raga Bairagi

Hindustani ragas